Charles Collins (September 18, 1882 – July 28, 1920) was a Canadian professional ice hockey forward who was active in the early 1900s.

Early life 
Collins was born in Collingwood, Ontario.

Career 
Amongst the teams Collins played for were the Canadian Soo Algonquins of the IPHL and the St. Catharines Pros of the OPHL. Collins also played in one exhibition game for the Toronto Tecumsehs.

In the 1904–05 season, in the notoriously rough IPHL, Collins was the only regular player that went unpenalized.

Statistics
Exh. = Exhibition games

Statistics per Society for International Hockey Research at sihrhockey.org

References

External links
The Origins and Development of the International Hockey League and its effect on the Sport of Professional Ice Hockey in North America Daniel Scott Mason, University of British Columbia, 1992

1882 births
1920 deaths
Canadian ice hockey right wingers
Ice hockey people from Ontario
Sault Ste. Marie Marlboros players